Shri Kali Temple is a Hindu temple located in the undefined Little India in downtown Yangon, Burma. It was built by Tamil migrants in 1871, whilst Burma Province was part of British India. The temple is noted for its colorful architecture, especially its roof, which contains images and stone carvings of many Hindu gods. The temple is maintained by the local Indian community.

See also
 Nathlaung Kyaung Temple
 Nanpaya Temple

References

Hindu temples in Myanmar
Burmese culture
Tamil diaspora in Asia
19th-century Hindu temples